Farcașa is a commune in Neamț County, Western Moldavia, Romania. It is composed of five villages: Bușmei, Farcașa, Frumosu, Popești and Stejaru.

References

Communes in Neamț County
Localities in Western Moldavia